Ayberk Pekcan (22 May 1970 – 24 January 2022) was a Turkish actor and former civil servant, politician and labourer.

Life and career
Born on 22 May 1970 in Mersin, Ayberk Pekcan spent his childhood and youth in Adana and his birthplace. After studying his primary and secondary education in Adana and high school in Mersin, he graduated from Mersin University Faculty of Fine Arts, Department of Theater. Pekcan was a labourer, a civil servant, and a teacher. He was a political member of the Social Democratic Populist Party in 1991 for local governments. In 2001, he resigned as a civil servant, settled in Istanbul and became a TV and film actor.

2001–2015
He played leading roles in television series Ihlamurlar Altında, Yaprak Dökümü, Kurtlar Vadisi and Keşanlı Ali Destanı. In 2010, his film, Saç received awards at national and international film festivals. He was awarded best supporting actor at the Ankara International Film Festival. Ayberk Pekcan, who has starred in many films and series, played the role of Artuk Bey in the popular TV-series Diriliş: Ertuğrul.

2015–2019: Diriliş: Ertuğrul
As Diriliş: Ertuğrul was well received in Pakistan, Ayberk Pekcan, along with Nurettin Sönmez, who plays the role of Bamsı Beyrek, arrived in the country to meet fans in 2020 on a three-day visit. They came with Turkish Foreign Minister Mevlüt Çavuşoğlu and a 20-member delegation. On their visit, they met Pakistani actor Hamza Ali Abbasi's sister Dr. Fazeela Abbasi and Nurettin Sönmez was "humbled" by Pakistani Prime Minister Imran Khan's appreciation of Diriliş: Ertuğrul while also expressing his desire to work with Pakistani actors. On the occasion, Ayberk Pekcan said, “...Pakistan and Turkey are brotherly countries, people of both countries are also brothers and Pakistan is our second homeland...” Before leaving, they also visited the Pak-Turk Maarif Chak Shahzad Campus, in Islamabad. Pekcan was also staying in touch with the Kuruluş: Osman cast, the sequel to Diriliş: Ertuğrul, sharing an image with them on Instagram.

Death
Ayberk Pekcan died from lung cancer in Mersin on 24 January 2022, at the age of 51.

Filmography

Film 
Dilberay (2022)
Mustang (2015) - Erol
Kış Uykusu (2014) - Hıdayet
Aşk ve Devrim (2011) - Pala
  (2010) - Hamdi
Ali'nin Sekiz Günü (2008) - Hacı
Neredesin Firuze (2003) - Pislik
Şeytan Bunun Neresinde (2002) - Köy Muhtarı/Terörist Başı
  (2002) - Katip Ali Şevki

Television 
Diriliş: Ertuğrul (2015–2019) - Artuk Bey
Sevdam Alabora (2015) - Hakan
Poyraz Karayel (2014)
Bir Aşk Hikayesi (2013) - Tahsin
   (2011-2012) - Teke Kazım
   (2008-2010) - Şemo
Yaprak Dökümü (2007) - Talat
Körfez Ateşi (2005) - Esat
   (2005) - Ekrem/Aynalı
Emanet ve İhanet (2004) - Ali
Dağlar Dağımdır (2005)
Türkü Filmi (2004)
Taşı Sıksam Suyunu Çıkarırım (2004)
Bir Dilim Aşk (2004) - Bülent
Kurtlar Vadisi (2004) - Doctor
Parmak İzi (2003)
   (2003)
   (2003) - Mustafa
Yarım Elma (2002)
   (2002) - Muammer
Bayanlar Baylar (2002)
   (2001)

Awards and nominations

References

External links

1970 births
2022 deaths
Turkish male film actors
Turkish male television actors
Mersin University alumni
People from Mersin
Turkish civil servants
Turkish political people
Social Democratic Populist Party (Turkey) politicians
Deaths from lung cancer in Turkey